Medellin, officially the Municipality of Medellin,  is a 2nd class municipality in the province of Cebu, Philippines. According to the 2020 census, it has a population of 59,605 people.

Medellin is one of the nine municipalities comprising the 4th Congressional District Cebu Province.

Medellin is bordered on the north by the town of Daanbantayan, to the west by the Tañon Strait, on the east by the Camotes Sea, on the southwest by the town of San Remigio and the southeast by the city of Bogo.

History

The name Medellin is of Spanish origin and refers to the village with the same name in the Badajoz province of Extremadura in Spain. Medellin became a municipality by royal decree of Queen Isabel II of Spain on September 9, 1881.

Medellin was formerly part of Daanbantayan. As a town, it started with only 3 barangays, namely; Kawit and Buenavista on the west coast, and Tindog on the east coast. Kawit, being the biggest and most progressive barangay at that time, became the first seat of government.

Due to its deep shore water, the area was prone to pirates. As a consequence, the seat of government was then transferred to Buenavista (Daanlungsod). However, in view of its shallow shore water, traders and merchants found it difficult to transport their wares to and from Buenavista. A distance away south of Buenavista, there was a place called Tawagan which was an ideal site for trade and commerce. When the seat of government was transferred to Tawagan, the new poblacion was then called Medellin.

Geography

Barangays

Medellin comprises 19 barangays:

Climate

Demographics

Economy

The principal source of livelihood among locals is Fishing and Farming while Tourism plays a promising future. Large tracts of land were engage in cultivating Sugarcane hence the tagged as the "Sugar Bowl of Cebu". A sugar milling company BOMEDCO is still operating since it was founded in the year 1928. Its mill is located in Barangay Luy-a, Medellin, Cebu. The principal product of the company is raw sugar.

References

External links
 [ Philippine Standard Geographic Code]

 https://www.reuters.com/companies/BMM.PS

Municipalities of Cebu